Platyptilia postbarbata is a moth of the family Pterophoridae. It is known from the Democratic Republic of Congo.

References

postbarbata
Endemic fauna of the Democratic Republic of the Congo
Insects of the Democratic Republic of the Congo
Moths of Africa
Moths described in 1938